Leslie Carter was an American singer.

Leslie Carter may also refer to:

Mrs. Leslie Carter (1862–1937), actress
Les Carter (footballer) (born 1960), English footballer
Leslie Carter, an English musician more widely known as Fruitbat

See also
Les Carter (disambiguation)
Rob Leslie-Carter (born 1970), British engineer and project manager